Elysius systron is a moth of the family Erebidae. It was described by William Schaus in 1904. It is found in Brazil.

References

systron
Moths described in 1904
Moths of South America